Sapporo Convention Center (札幌流通総合会館) also known as SORA, is a convention center located in Shiroishi-ku, Sapporo, Hokkaido, Japan.

Overview 
Opened in June 2003, this multipurpose convention center comprehends the Main Hall: with an area of 2,607 m2 (capacity of 2,500 seats), the Conference Hall, the Medium Hall, the Small Hall, and 15 meeting-rooms on two floors. The total land area of the center is approximately 20,300 m2.

The Hokkaido University entrance ceremony has been held in the Main Hall of the Center since 2004. It is also used as a venue for Professional Wrestling (Puroresu).

Access 
 Tōzai Line: 8 minutes walk from Higashi-Sapporo Station.

External links 
 Official site

Convention centers in Japan
Buildings and structures in Sapporo
Tourist attractions in Sapporo
Event venues established in 2003
2003 establishments in Japan